Edi Dharmam Edi Nyayam is a 1982 Indian Telugu-language thriller film simultaneously made in Tamil as Neethi Devan Mayakkam. Directed by Bapu, the film stars Bhanu Chander and Madhavi. Kamal Haasan acted as Military Officer in a guest appearance in the Tamil version and in Telugu by Krishna. The film was a remake of the Hindi film Insaf Ka Tarazu, which in turn was a remake of the 1976 Hollywood film Lipstick.

Cast

Soundtrack

References

External links 
 
 

1982 films
1980s Tamil-language films
1980s Telugu-language films
Indian multilingual films
Films about rape in India
Indian drama films
Films about social issues in India
Films directed by Bapu
Films scored by K. V. Mahadevan
Tamil remakes of Hindi films
Telugu remakes of Hindi films
Indian courtroom films
1982 drama films
1982 multilingual films